The Anti-Cruelty Society is an animal welfare organization and animal shelter in the River North neighborhood of Chicago, Illinois. The Anti-Cruelty Society (SPCA of Illinois) is a private, not-for-profit humane society that does not receive government assistance. It is one of the largest such organizations in the United States. The organization offers adoption, veterinarian, and training services.

It was founded on January 19, 1899, by a group of Chicago residents who had concerns about the treatment of the city's animals, from stray cats and dogs, to workhorses, to livestock. The Anti-Cruelty Society exists to prevent cruelty to animals and to advance humane education. Their mission is building a community of caring by helping pets and educating people.

The Anti-Cruelty Society changed its policies to align with the no kill movement, in 2004, turning strays over to Chicago Animal Care and Control.

History

1899-1911 
Rosa Fay Thomas founded the Anti-Cruelty Society on January 19, 1899 in Chicago and was elected first acting president, upon the belief that society had an obligation to care and raise awareness for animals living in cruel conditions. Its first shelter for small animals opened in 1904. The Anti-Cruelty Society’s first campaign to eliminate animal mistreatment/provide better care for animals involved improving the living and working conditions of workhorses in the city of Chicago in 1905. Early goals of the foundation concentrated on endeavors for workhorses, livestock, and small animals. For a short time, in addition to animal welfare, the Anti-Cruelty Society focused its efforts on child welfare cases. In 1906, the State of Illinois allotted a charter to the Anti-Cruelty Society to ensure the welfare of both animal and child welfare. During this time, the Anti-Cruelty Society implemented its first humane education movement to provide basic access to literature and lectures.

1911-1949 
The demand for services provided by the Anti-Cruelty Society grew exponentially during the Great Depression.

The Anti-cruelty society runs only through the funds that are donated to them. The Anti-cruelty society started after Rosa saw the mistreatment of horses. One of their first acts of business was putting up drinking fountains for the horses.

1950-2000 
In 1976 the Anti-Cruelty Society began the volunteer program that is still open available today.

The Anti-Cruelty Society's Mobile Vaccination Clinic began in 1986 offering free exams and vaccinations for cats and dogs to the disadvantaged neighborhoods in Chicago.

2001-2010 
As of 2004 the Anti-Cruelty Society stopped accepting stray dogs and cats into their shelters.

As of 2010 The Anti-Cruelty Society has been using the services provided by Pet Point Data Management System, run by PetHealth. They provide inventory on adoptable cats and dogs which can help keep track of animal populations and facilitates the adoption processes. This service is provided for free to non-profit animal organizations and when an animal is adopted they provide a trackable chip.

2011-2020 
In 2014, Chicago's Alderman passed the Anti-Puppy Mill Ordinance 49-1, which did not allow dogs, cats and other animals to be sheltered if they came from large-scale breeding operations. This helps to prevent the animals that are in current shelters to be forgotten about; sales on animals made by breeders often get sold in pet shops which leaves animals in shelters, who are usually mixed breeds and older to be overlooked.

In February 2019, Tracy Elliott, the Executive Director of Ashville Humane Society, became the new president.

In the pandemic of 2020, with a grant from PetSmart Charities, the Anti-Cruelty Society offered supplies of pet food to families affected by Covid-19. The Anti-cruelty Society also expanded the "Friends Who Care" program to help pet owners receive veterinarian services for their pets.

Before Illinois' stay-at-home order in March 2020, the Anti-Cruelty Society urged people to Foster animals because of an influx of pets and a limit of space in the shelters.

Services

Adoption 
The vice president of the Anti-Cruelty Society, Peggy Froh Asseo, listed 6,000 animals that were adopted in 2004. The same year, they also implemented their new "no kill" policy expecting their number of adoptions to raise up to 8,000.

The Anti-Cruelty Society has a yearly event, "Clear The Shelter", where the adoption fees are waived and all their pets are up to date in vaccines.

With the Covid-19 pandemic being expanded through the end of April 2020 the Anti-Cruelty Society moved their adoption services online.

Clinic 
The Anti-Cruelty Society's spay/neuter clinic—one of the highest volume spay/neuter clinics in the country—performed over 12,000 surgeries. The Society also found new homes for nearly 6,000 animals.

See also
List of animal welfare groups

External links
Official website

References

Animal shelters in the United States
Animal welfare organizations based in the United States
Organizations established in 1889
Non-profit organizations based in Chicago